The Carowinds Monorail was a monorail at the Carowinds amusement park in Fort Mill, South Carolina.  Opening on June 2, 1973, it existed solely for entertainment, not transportation, as it had only one station. The ride would close in August 1994, and be relocated to the Vidafel Mayan Palace resort in Acapulco.

History
The Carowinds Monorail was built by Universal Mobility Incorporated and opened on June 2, 1973, with both Governor of North Carolina James Holshouser and Governor of South Carolina John C. West present for the inaugural ride. Originally, the monorail was to have connected the park with a hotel that was never built. The attraction would reach a peak of 500,000 riders in 1982, only to fall in subsequent years resulting in its closure in August 1994. At the time of its closure, the monorail had a daily ridership of 7,000. Its deconstruction would commence in November 1994 and be complete by December. The deconstructed monorail was then shipped to Acapulco, Mexico, by way of barge and reassembled in 1995 at the Vidafel Mayan Palace resort.

References

Passenger rail transportation in North Carolina
Passenger rail transportation in South Carolina
History of Charlotte, North Carolina
Fort Mill, South Carolina
Monorails in the United States
Railway lines opened in 1973
Railway lines closed in 1994
Amusement rides introduced in 1973
Amusement rides that closed in 1994
Carowinds
Entertainment monorails
Defunct monorails
1973 establishments in North Carolina
1973 establishments in South Carolina
1994 disestablishments in North Carolina
1994 disestablishments in South Carolina